Calotes is a genus of lizards in the draconine clade of the family Agamidae. The genus contains 29 species. Some species are known as forest lizards, others as "bloodsuckers" due to their red heads, and yet others (namely C. versicolor) as garden lizards. The genus name Calotes has been derived from the Greek word Καλότης (Kalótës), meaning ‘beauty’, referring to the beautiful pattern of this genus.

Geographic range
Species in the genus Calotes are native to South Asia, southern China, mainland Southeast Asia and Ambon. Additionally, C. versicolor has been introduced to Florida (USA), Borneo, Sulawesi, the Seychelles, Mauritius and Oman. The greatest species richness of the genus is from the Western Ghats, northeast India, Myanmar, Bangladesh and Sri Lanka.

Description
Calotes is distinguished from related genera in having uniform-sized dorsal scales, and lacking a fold of skin extending between the cheek and shoulder, and in having proportionately stronger limbs than Pseudocalotes. Compared to Bronchocela, Calotes have a proportionately shorter tail and limbs. Calotes as we know it today was classified by Moody (1980) prior to which all of the above-mentioned genera were included in this genus.

Taxonomy
The genus Calotes is still a heterogeneous group that may be divided into the C. versicolor and C. liocephalus groups. The former occurs through most of South Asia and further east. All species in this group have their dorsal and lateral scales directed upward. The latter is restricted to the southern Western Ghats and Sri Lanka. All species in this group have their scales directed back, or up and down, or down only. Whether further splitting is necessary or whether the groups constitute subgenera of a monophyletic Calotes remains to be studied.

Species
Listed alphabetically.<ref>Calotes. The Reptile Database. www.reptile-database.org.</ref>

 Calotes bachae 
 Calotes bhutanensis 
 Calotes calotes  – common green forest lizard
 Calotes ceylonensis  – painted-lip lizard, Ceylon bloodsucker
 Calotes chincollium 
 Calotes desilvai  - Morningside lizard, Ceylon black-band whistling lizard
 Calotes emma  – Emma Gray's forest lizard, forest crested lizard
 Calotes emma alticristatus 
 Calotes emma emma 
 Calotes farooqi  – Farooq's garden lizard
 Calotes geissleri 
 Calotes goetzi 
 Calotes grandisquamis  – large-scaled forest lizard
 Calotes htunwini 
 Calotes irawadi 
 Calotes jerdoni  – Jerdon's forest lizard
 Calotes liocephalus  – spineless forest lizard, crestless lizard, lionhead agama
 Calotes liolepis  – whistling lizard, Sri Lanka agama
 Calotes manamendrai  – Manamendra-Arachchi's whistling lizard
 Calotes maria  – Khasi Hills forest lizard
 Calotes medogensis  – Medog bloodsucker
 Calotes minor  – Hardwicke's bloodsucker
 Calotes mystaceus  – Indo-Chinese forest lizard, blue-crested lizard
 Calotes nemoricola  – Nilgiri forest lizard
 Calotes nigrilabris  – black-cheek lizard
 Calotes nigriplicatus 
 Calotes paulus  – small forest lizard
 Calotes pethiyagodai 
 Calotes versicolor  – Oriental garden lizard, changeable lizard, eastern garden lizard
 Calotes vindumbarbatus 
 Calotes zolaiking  – Mizoram montane forest lizard

Two species formerly treated as members of the genus were separated into a new genus in 2018 - Monilesaurus:
 Monilesaurus ellioti  – Elliot's forest lizard
 Monilesaurus rouxii  – Roux's forest lizard,  Roux's forest CalotesNota bene: A binomial authority in parentheses or a trinomial authority in parentheses indicates that the species or the subspecies was originally described in a genus other than Calotes.

Gallery

Further reading

HALLERMANN J, BÖHME W. 2000. A review of the genus Pseudocalotes (Squamata: Agamidae), with description of a new species from West Malaysia. Amphibia-Reptilia 21: 193–210.
HALLERMANN J. 2005. A taxonomic review of the genus Bronchocela (Squamata: Agamidae), with description of a new species from Vietnam. Russian Journal of Herpetology 12 (3): 167–182.
MOODY SM. 1980. Phylogenetic relationships and historical biogeographical relationships of the genera in the family Agamidae (Reptilia: Lacertilia). PhD dissertation. University of Michigan.
ZUG GR, BROWN HHK, SCHULTE JA II, VINDUM JV. 2006. Systematics of the garden lizards, Calotes versicolor Group (Reptilia, Squamata, Agamidae), in Myanmar: Central Dry Zone populations. Proceedings of the California Academy of Sciences'', Series 4, 57 (2): 35–68.

References

 
Lizard genera
Taxa named by Georges Cuvier